John Christopher Burch (October 27, 1827 – July 28, 1881) served as secretary of the United States Senate.

Burch, son of Morton N. and Mary (Ballard) Burch, was born in Jefferson County, Georgia, October 27, 1827.

He graduated from Yale College in 1847. He studied law with Gov. Charles McDonald of Georgia and practiced for three years in his native State, removing to Chattanooga, Tenn., in 1852. In 1855 and 1856 he was elected to the lower house of the Tennessee State Legislature, and in 1857 and 1858 to a seat in the Tennessee State Senate, bringing such a reputation for ability and fairness that he was made the presiding officer, notwithstanding his youth and little experience.

In 1859 he removed to Nashville, undertaking besides the practice of his profession the editorship of the Nashville Union and American, the old Democratic newspaper of the State. During the stormy canvass of 1860, he took the Southern side with fervor in his editorial position, and from 1861 to 1865 served faithfully in the Confederate Army, at first on the staff of Gen. Pillow, and subsequently as aide to Gen. Forrest and Gen. Withers.

At the close of the American Civil War, he resumed the practice of law in Nashville, and was attaining high rank at the bar, when in 1869 he was tempted to purchase a controlling influence in the paper which he had formerly edited, and to assume the duties of managing editor.  He was thus occupied for the remaining years.

In 1873, he was appointed as Comptroller of the State; there were allegations that Burch had purchased this office, but an investigation officially cleared him.

In March 1879, he was elected Secretary of the US Senate, under the Democratic reorganization. In this situation he won the esteem of Senators of all parties, and at his death left an excellent record for probity and efficiency.  He died in Washington, July 28, 1881, in his 54th year, from heart disease, supervening on an existing complication of diseases of the liver and kidneys.

He was married in 1852 to Lucy Newell, who survived him with four sons and two daughters.

References

External links
 US Senate History bio

1827 births
1881 deaths
Yale College alumni
People from Jefferson County, Georgia
Members of the Tennessee House of Representatives
Tennessee state senators
Tennessee lawyers
American newspaper editors
State cabinet secretaries of Tennessee
Secretaries of the United States Senate
19th-century American politicians
19th-century American lawyers